Jon Stoll (1953–2008) was the founder and president of Fantasma Productions, one of the world's longest standing and largest concert promoters and producers.

Early life 
Jonathan Edward Stoll was born in Mamaroneck, N.Y. on November 6, 1953 to Marjorie and Larry Stoll. As a 15-year-old student in Mamaroneck, Stoll decided to raise money for his school by staging a battle of the bands. He also gained valuable experience working backstage at New York-area theaters, and at 18 he was managing a rock band. While at Bryant College in Smithfield, R.I., he continued to stage shows, and when his parents moved to Fort Lauderdale, he soon began promoting concerts at South Florida drive-in theaters. "For $3 or $4 you could go see a concert, film, etc.," he said in 1985. "We'd draw 6,000 to 10,000 people."

Fantasma Productions 
In 1985, Stoll founded Fantasma Productions, which promoted concerts, staged trade shows, and published Easy Times, a youth-oriented weekly newspaper. Gradually, the Fantasma Productions expanded to Miami and Fort Lauderdale, then throughout Florida, the Southeast and other major venues, including in Las Vegas. Fantasma also was responsible for booking acts for SunFest, Mizner Park in Boca Raton and the Seminole Hard Rock Hotel and Casino Hollywood. Stoll bought the Carefree Theatre in West Palm Beach, converting parts of the building into a retail art gallery, sports bar, bistro, and comedy club known as the Comedy Corner. The theatre also played host to the Palm Beach Film Festival and the South Florida Jewish Film Festival every year and began showing foreign films in 1990. By 1987, Fantasma had grown to 50 employees who booked and managed more than 500 concerts a year. After hurricanes in 2005 damaged the Carefree Theatre beyond repair, he bought an abandoned church just north of Southern Boulevard, off Parker Avenue, and created The Theatre, another small concert hall.

In the mid-'90s, Stoll was one of the few independent promoters who refused buyout attempts by large corporations, maintaining that it was bad for business and bad for artists. "I just think it's unfortunate that there are less options for artists," he told The New York Times in 2006. "If you have no options, then you have to deal with one buyer – and whatever they decide to pay you." In 2000, he was named Independent Promoter of the Year at the 12th Annual Pollstar Awards in Las Vegas, and in 2007 he served as president of the National Association of Concert Promoters. In late 2007, Stoll had a stroke that required surgery. On January 12, 2008, at age 54, Stoll died of complications from brain cancer.

References

 
 
 
 
 

Music promoters
Deaths from brain tumor
West Palm Beach, Florida
1953 births
2008 deaths